Wohlwend is a surname. Notable people with the surname include: 

Christine Wohlwend (born 1978), Liechtensteiner politician
Fabienne Wohlwend (born 1997), Liechtenstein racing driver
Greg Wohlwend, American video game developer
Johannes Wohlwend (born 1964), Liechtenstein judoka
Neil Wohlwend (1913–1978), American football and basketball coach, and politician